Blythe is an English surname.

Geographical distribution
As of 2014, 58.1% of all known bearers of the surname Blythe were residents of the United States (frequency 1:32,907), 24.0% of England (1:12,271), 6.1% of Australia (1:20,745), 3.3% of Canada (1:58,971), 2.4% of Jamaica (1:6,454), 1.3% of Scotland (1:21,333) and 1.1% of New Zealand (1:22,751).

In England, the frequency of the surname was higher than average (1:12,271) in the following counties:
 1. Cumbria (1:4,362)
 2. Tyne and Wear (1:4,908)
 3. Cheshire (1:5,072)
 4. Northumberland (1:5,876)
 5. North Yorkshire (1:6,261)
 6. County Durham (1:6,465)
 7. Lincolnshire (1:6,820)
 8. Nottinghamshire (1:7,757)
 9. Norfolk (1:8,388)
 10. East Riding of Yorkshire (1:8,392)
 11. South Yorkshire (1:8,427)
 12. Kent (1:8,515)
 13. Rutland (1:9,486)
 14. West Yorkshire (1:9,976) 
 15. Merseyside (1:10,365)
 16. Gloucestershire (1:10,496)
 17. Cambridgeshire (1:10,878)
 18. East Sussex (1:11,379)
 19. Leicestershire (1:11,489)
 20. Warwickshire (1:11,826)
 21. Hertfordshire (1:11,831)

In the United States, the frequency of the surname was higher than average (1:32,907) in the following states:
 1. Kentucky (1:8,270)
 2. North Carolina (1:11,002)
 3. Delaware (1:14,597)
 4. Iowa (1:15,010)
 5. Indiana (1:16,313)
 6. Alabama (1:17,446)
 7. Virginia (1:18,318)
 8. Arkansas (1:19,473)
 9. Kansas (1:20,879)
 10. Mississippi (1:21,264)
 11. Oregon (1:21,994)
 12. Montana (1:22,653)
 13. Ohio (1:23,491)
 14. Oklahoma (1:24,570)
 15. Tennessee (1:24,973)
 16. Nebraska (1:25,468)
 17. Georgia (1:27,862)
 18. Texas (1:29,336)
 19. New Mexico (1:30,514)
 20. Illinois (1:31,751)

People
Adam Blythe (born 1989), British road cyclist
Arthur Blythe (1940–2017), American jazz alto saxophonist and composer
Betty Blythe (1893–1972), American actress 
Bill Clinton (William Blythe, born 1946), 42nd American president 
Colin Blythe (1879–1917), English cricketer
Daniel Blythe (born 1969), British author
Domini Blythe (1947–2010), British-born Canadian actress
Ernest Blythe (1889–1975), Irish politician
Geoffrey Blythe (died c. 1530), Bishop of Lichfield and Coventry
Geoffrey Blythe (divine) (died 1542), English clergyman
Jimmy Blythe (1901–1931), American jazz and boogie woogie pianist
John Blythe (disambiguation), several people
Mabel Blythe (1930–2004), Sri Lankan actress and singer
Matty Blythe, English rugby league player
Nils Blythe (born 1956), British journalist and Director of Communications at the Bank of England
Peter Blythe (1934–2004), British character actor
Randy Blythe (born 1971), vocalist of American heavy metal band Lamb of God and side-project band Halo of Locusts
Robert Blythe (actor), Welsh actor
Ronald Blythe (1922–2023), British writer and editor
Samuel George Blythe (1868–1947), American writer and newspaperman
Stephanie Blythe (born 1970), American mezzo-soprano opera singer
Thomas Henry Blythe (1822–1883), American entrepreneur, pioneer of irrigation in the Colorado River valley. Blythe, California is named after him.
Wilfred Lawson Blythe (1896–1975), British colonial administrator.
William Blythe (disambiguation), multiple people with the name

Fictional characters:
Gilbert Blythe, fictional character in Lucy Maud Montgomery's Anne of Green Gables novel series

See also
Blyth (surname)
Albert Blithe (1923-1967), career soldier in the United States Army

References

 English-language surnames